Flon or Le Flon may refer to:

Suzanne Flon (1918–2005), French film actress and comedian
Le Flon, a municipality in the canton of Fribourg in Switzerland
Le Flon (Lausanne), an area of the city of Lausanne, Switzerland
Flon, Sweden, a village located in Härjedalen, Sweden

See also
F'lon, one of the characters in Dragonriders of Pern, a science fiction series by Anne McCaffrey